Victor Nnamdi Okafor Ezego (25 December 1964– 25 December 1999) predominantly known by his chieftaincy title Ezego which means "King Of Money" in English, was a very opulent Nigerian businessman who reportedly engaged in diabolical means in order to amass wealth. Ezego died on 25 December 1999 at the age of 35 under bizarre circumstances.

Early life and education
Ezego was born on the 25th of December in 1964. He is a native of Ihiala in Anambra state late. Ezego attended only grade school and would abandon education entirely. He joined an armed robbery syndicate that terrorized the people of Anambra state for years. In 1988, every member of the armed robbery squad were apprehended except Ezego, he was elusive and evaded arrest severally and in 1989 he relocated to Lagos state to pursue business opportunities.

Source of wealth
Ezego's source of wealth was questionable as he amassed his wealth after a very brief stay at by wisdom Ogbonna Lagos state.

Lifestyle
Ezego led a flamboyant Lifestyle whilst alive. He had chains of businesses, mansions, a vast collection of expensive automobiles and always travelled with a convoy. All of which became useless after his death, All his cars rusted as no one was willing to drive nor purchase them, his houses were abandoned as no one wanted to live in them or purchase them either as the community firmly believed he made his money through diabolical means. Furthermore, all his businesses collapsed under strange circumstances.

Death
On December 25, 1999, on his birthday, he was involved in a fatal automobile crash under bizarre circumstances. Ezego hardly ever drove, rather he had a personal chauffeur whom he travelled with but on the day Ezego died in the crash, it was reported that he instructed the chauffeur not to drive and that he intended to drive himself.

References
 

Igbo painters
Nigerian businesspeople
1964 births
1999 deaths
Igbo people
People from Anambra State